The Two-Fisted Lover is a 1920 American short silent Western film directed by Edward Laemmle and featuring Hoot Gibson.

Cast
 Hoot Gibson
 Dorothy Wood
 Jim Corey
 Walter Crowley
 Katherine Bates
 Nancy Caswell
 Charles Newton

See also
 Hoot Gibson filmography

References

External links
 

1920 films
1920 Western (genre) films
1920 short films
American silent short films
American black-and-white films
Films directed by Edward Laemmle
Silent American Western (genre) films
1920s American films
1920s English-language films